Emma Baron (19 October 1904 – 7 March 1986) was an Italian stage and film actress.

Life and career 
Born Emma Bardon in Treviso, after getting an arts degree she began her career on stage in the 1920s, entering the theatrical companies of Maria Melato and Marta Abba. Baron made her film debut in 1935, playing a leading role in Freccia d'oro; in this film she knew the actor  Ennio Cerlesi, who one year later became her husband as well as a frequent partner on stage. Starting from the 1940s, Baron  started an intense  film career as a character actress, specializing in roles of mothers.

Partial filmography
Baron appeared in the following films:

1935: Golden Arrow (C. D'Errico and P. Ballerini) - Contessa Sonia Larman
1936: Un bacio a fior d'acqua (G. Guarino) - Wally
1936: The Anonymous Roylott (R. Matarazzo)
1938: Il suo destino (E. Guazzoni) - La moglie di Andrea
1941: I promessi sposi (M. Camerini) - La madre di Cecilia (uncredited)
1942: Love Story (M. Camerini) - L'infermiera della clinica
1942: Giorno di nozze (R. Matarazzo)
1948: Gioventù perduta (P. Germi) - La signora Manfredi (uncredited)
1950: Atto di accusa (G. Gentilomo) - Signora Pacetti
1950: L'edera (A. Genina) - Donna Francesca
1951: I miracoli non si ripetono (Y. Allégret) - La patronne de l'hôtel
1951: La città si difende (P. Germi) - La madre di Alberto
1951: The Ungrateful Heart (G. Brignone)
1951: L'ultima sentenza (M. Bonnard) - Madre di Piero
1951: Quo vadis (M. LeRoy)
1952: Viva il cinema! (G. Baldaccini and E. Trapani)
1952: Camicie rosse (G. Alessandrini) - La signora Guiccioli
1952: Falsehood (U.M. Del Colle) - Maddalena
1952: Don Lorenzo (C.L. Bragaglia)
1952: Cento piccole mamme (G. Morelli)
1953: Perdonami! (M. Costa) - Marisa
1953: Legione straniera (B. Franchina) - Madre superiora
1953: The Story of William Tell (J. Cardiff) - Max's wife
1953: Cavallina storna (G. Morelli) - Caterina Pascoli moglie di Ruggero
1954: Disonorata senza colpa (G.W. Chili) - Suor Maria
1954: Avanzi di galera (V. Cottafavi)
1954: The Shadow (G. Bianchi) - Luisa
1954: Vergine moderna (M. Pagliero)
1954: Canzone d'amore (G.C. Simonelli)
1955: Le signorine dello 04 (G. Franciolini) - Head of Switchboard Operators (uncredited)
1955: Bella, non piangere! (D. Carbonari) - Madre di Enrico
1955: The Lost City (M. Alexandre and R.M. Torrecilla) - Madre de Rafael
1955: Disowned (G.W. Chili)
1955: The Song of the Heart (C. Campogalliani)
1955: Giuramento d'amore (R. Bianchi Montero) - La madre di Paolo
1955: Io piaccio (G. Bianchi) - Doriana Paris' Assistant (uncredited)
1955: I quattro del getto tonante (F. Cerchio) - Madre di Montanari
1955: Un palco all'opera (S. Marcellini)
1955: Desperate Farewell (L. De Felice) - Maurizio Mancini's Mother (uncredited)
1956: Suor Letizia (M. Camerini) - Una monaca all'aeroporto (uncredited)
1956: Giovanni dalle Bande Nere (S. Grieco) - madre di Emma
1956: Una voce, una chitarra e un po' di luna (G. Gentilomo) - Signora Romoli
1956: Te sto aspettanno (A. Fizzarotti)
1956: Difendo il mio amore (G. Macchi)
1957: Operazione notte (G. Bennati)
1957: Padri e figli (M. Monicelli) - Missis Bacci
1957: Saranno uomini (S. Siano)
1957: La canzone del destino (M. Girolami)
1957: Malafemmena (A. Fizzarotti)
1958: Anna di Brooklyn (C. Lastricati and R. Denbam)
1958: Un amore senza fine (L. Knaut and M. Terribile)
1958: Il cielo brucia (G. Masini)
1958: Afrodite, dea dell'amore (M. Bonnard) - Onoria
1958: Il bacio del sole / Don Vesuvio (S. Marcellini) - La madre di Vincenzo
1958: Amore e guai (A. Dorigo) - Signora Renata
1959: First Love (M. Camerini) - Maria Lojacono
1959: Ben-Hur - Jewish Woman (uncredited)
1960: David e Golia (R. Pottier and F. Baldi) - Anna - mother of David
1960: Teseo contro il Minotauro (S. Amadio) - Madre - Addottiva di Arianna
1960: La ciociara (V. De Sica) - Maria
1960: La garçonnière (G. De Santis)
1961: La viaccia (M. Bolognini) - Giovanna
1961: La vendetta della maschera di ferro (F. De Feo)
1961: Maciste contro il vampiro (G. Gentilomo and S. Corbucci) - Maciste's mother
1961: Barabba (R. Fleischer) - Maria (uncredited)
1962: Dieci italiani per un tedesco (F.W. Ratti) - Mariella's Mother
1962: Ponzio Pilato (G.P. Callegari and I. Rapper) - Dirce
1962: Il disordine (F. Brusati) - Mario's old mother
1962: Duello nella Sila (U. Lenzi)
1962: Le due leggi (E. Mulargia)
1963: Mafia alla sbarra (O. Palella)
1963: Gli invincibili sette (A. De Martino) - Mother
1964: Il giovedì (D. Risi) - Giulia Versini
1964: L'intrigo (G. Marshall and V. Sala) - Gregoria
1964: Amore mio (R. Matarazzo) - Ottavia
1965: Il tormento e l'estasi (C. Reed)
1966: Arizona Colt (M. Lupo)
1968: Vivo per la tua morte (A. Burts (C. Bazzoni)) - Mrs. Sturges
1969: Due volte Giuda (N. Cicero) - Mrs. Barret
1970: Angeli senza paradiso (E.M. Fizzarotti) - Mother of Marta
1971: Le calde notti di Don Giovanni (A. Bradley [A. Brescia]) - Madre superiore (uncredited) (final film role)

References

External links 
 

Italian film actresses
Italian stage actresses
1904 births
1986 deaths
People from Treviso
20th-century Italian actresses